This is a list of New Zealand men's international footballers – association football players who have played for the New Zealand national football team in officially recognised international matches. All players with official full international caps are listed here.

List of players
Key

This table takes into account all New Zealand A-international matches played up to and including 25 September 2022 after the game against Australia.

See also
List of New Zealand women's international footballers
List of New Zealand sportspeople

References

External links
New Zealand Football Association
FIFA page on New Zealand
All Time Stats of the All Whites

 
 
New Zealand
footballers
international footballers
Association football player non-biographical articles